= Medical Independent =

Medical Independent is a medical newspaper aimed at Healthcare Professionals in Ireland with 30 issues annually. It was established in 2010 and aims to investigate and analyse the major issues affecting healthcare in Ireland. The newspaper has received a number of awards and accolades for its investigative journalism. Its investigations are widely picked by national media and organisations. The current editor of Medical Independent is Paul Mulholland. The news editor is Catherine Reilly. The news team also includes investigative reporter, David Lynch. Medical Independent is one of a number of publications published by GreenCross Publishing which is owned by Graham Cooke. The Dublin-based publishing house also publishes Medical Independent, a breaking news site aimed at Irish doctors, healthcare professionals and the wider public with an interest in the healthcare sector and Med iLearning, an online continuing professional development site for Irish doctors and healthcare professionals. It also publishes Irish Pharmacist, an independent, monthly publication aimed at pharmacists in Ireland; Pharmacy Assistant incorporating Pharmacy Technician, a quarterly publication aimed at pharmacy assistants and technicians, and Nursing in General Practice, a bi-monthly publication aimed at nurses.
